Florence Vidor (née Cobb, later Arto; July 23, 1895 – November 3, 1977) was an American silent film actress.

Early life
Vidor was born in Houston on July 23, 1895, to John and Ida Cobb. Her parents had married in Houston on March 3, 1894, but divorced only three years later. Ida remained in Houston and soon married John P. Arto, a real estate man who later served as deputy chief of the city's fire department.

Career

Florence Vidor started working in silent movies through the influence of her husband, film director King Vidor, whom she had married in 1915. She signed her first contract with Vitagraph Studios in 1916. Her early fame was due to her role in the 1921 film Hail the Woman. Throughout the 1920s, she was a major box office attraction for Paramount Pictures. Her career ended with the advent of sound films. In 1929 she became so frustrated by the difficulties of making the partial sound film Chinatown Nights that she retired from acting before the production was completed. Director William A. Wellman had to use a voice double to complete some of her scenes.

Personal life and death
Florence and King Vidor divorced in 1924. They had a daughter, Suzanne. Despite the end of their marriage, Florence continued to use Vidor as her surname. 

Vidor married classical violinist Jascha Heifetz on August 20, 1928, in New York City. They had two children together and Heifetz also adopted Suzanne before divorcing in 1945. 

On November 3, 1977, Vidor died at her home in Pacific Palisades, California, aged 82.

Selected filmography

 Bill Peter's Kid (1916, Short) - (uncredited)
 Curfew at Simpton Center (1916, Short)
 The Yellow Girl (1916, Short) - Flora
 The Intrigue (1916) - Pseudo Countess Sonia
 A Tale of Two Cities (1917) - Mimi
 American Methods (1917) - Betty Armstrong
 The Cook of Canyon Camp (1917, Lost film) - Mrs. Jack
 Hashimura Togo (1917) - Corinne Reynolds
 The Countess Charming (1917) - Betty Lovering
 The Secret Game (1917) - Kitty Little
 The Widow's Might (1918, Lost film) - Irene Stuart
 The Hidden Pearls (1918) - Enid Benton
 The Honor of His House (1918) - Lora Horning
 The White Man's Law (1918) - Maida Verne
 Old Wives for New (1918) - Juliet Raeburn
 The Bravest Way (1918) - Nume Rogers
 Till I Come Back to You (1918) - Yvonne
 A Heart in Pawn (1919) - Dr. Stone's daughter
 The Other Half (1919) - Katherine Boone
 Poor Relations (1919) - Dorothy Perkins
 The Family Honor (1920) - Beverly Tucker
 The Jack-Knife Man (1920) - Mrs. Marcia Montgomery
 Lying Lips (1921) - Nancy Abbott
 Beau Revel (1921) - Nellie Steel
 Hail the Woman (1921) - Judith Beresford
 Woman, Wake Up (1922, Lost film) - Anne
 The Real Adventure (1922) - Rose Stanton
 Dusk to Dawn (1922, Undetermined / presumed lost) - Marjorie Latham / Aziza
 Skin Deep (1922) - Ethel Carter
 Conquering the Woman (1922) - Judith Stafford
 Souls for Sale (1923) - Himself (uncredited)
 Alice Adams (1923) - Alice Adams
 Main Street (1923, Lost film) - Carol Milford
 The Virginian (1923) - Molly Wood (Woods in credits)
 The Marriage Circle (1924) - Charlotte Braun
 Borrowed Husbands (1924, Lost film) - Nancy Burrard
 Welcome Stranger (1924, Lost film) - Mary Clark
 Barbara Frietchie (1924) - Barbara Frietchie
 Christine of the Hungry Heart (1924) - Christine Madison
 Husbands and Lovers (1924) - Grace Livingston
 The Mirage (1924, Lost film) - Irene Martin
 The Girl of Gold (1925) - Helen Merrimore
 Are Parents People? (1925) - Mrs. Hazlitt
 Grounds for Divorce (1925, Incomplete, missing third reel) - Alice Sorbier
 Marry Me (1925) - Hetty Gandy
 The Trouble with Wives (1925, Lost film) - Grace Hyatt
 The Enchanted Hill (1926, Lost film) - Gail Ormsby
 The Grand Duchess and the Waiter (1926) - The Grand Duchess Zenia
 Sea Horses (1926, Lost film) - Helen Salvia
 You Never Know Women (1926) - Vera
 The Eagle of the Sea (1926, Incomplete film) - Louise Lestron
 The Popular Sin (1926, Lost film) - Yvonne Montfort
 Afraid to Love (1927, Lost film) - Katherine Silverton
 The World at Her Feet (1927, Lost film) - Jane Randall
 One Woman to Another (1927, Lost film) - Rita Farrell
 Honeymoon Hate (1927, Lost film) - Gail Grant
 Doomsday (1928) - Mary Viner
 The Magnificent Flirt (1928, Lost film) - Mme. Florence Laverne
 The Patriot (1928, Lost film, only one reel exists) - Countess Ostermann
 Chinatown Nights (1929) - Joan Fry (final film role)

References

External links

  
  Florence Vidor at Golden Silents
  Florence Vidor at Virtual History

1895 births
1977 deaths
Actresses from Texas
American silent film actresses
People from Houston
People from Greater Los Angeles
20th-century American actresses